"Don't Go There" is the second single from English rapper Giggs, released from his second studio album Let Em Ave It and features vocals from American hip hop recording artist B.o.B. The single was released in the United Kingdom on February 20, 2010 as a digital download and is the first to be released following Giggs' signing with the record label: XL Recordings.

Official video 
On January 11, 2010 the official video for "Don't Go There" was released on YouTube.

Track listing

Chart performance
"Don't Go There" debuted at number sixty on the UK Singles Chart on 21 February 2010 ― for the week ending dated 27 February 2010 ― becoming Giggs' first Top 100 hit. The single also debuted on the UK Indie Chart and UK R&B Chart at number three and number sixteen respectively.

References

2010 singles
Giggs (rapper) songs
B.o.B songs
Songs written by B.o.B
Takeover Entertainment singles
2010 songs
Songs written by Giggs (rapper)
Music videos directed by Adam Powell